Anastasios Salonidis (born 10 June 1979) is a retired Greek football defender.

References

1979 births
Living people
Greek footballers
FC Wil players
FC St. Gallen players
Trikala F.C. players
SC Young Fellows Juventus players
APEP FC players
FC Chur 97 players
Swiss Super League players
Super League Greece players
Cypriot First Division players
Association football defenders
Greek expatriate footballers
Expatriate footballers in Switzerland
Greek expatriate sportspeople in Switzerland
Expatriate footballers in Cyprus
Greek expatriate sportspeople in Cyprus